USS Bold (BAT-8), was a Favourite class tugboat built for the British along the lines of American ATR-1-class rescue tugs. She was transferred to the United Kingdom on 29 June 1942 and was operated as HMS Bold (W114) by the Royal Navy.

She was returned to the United States Navy at Subic Bay in the Philippines in January 1946. Bold was struck from the Navy List on 17 July 1947. On 29 June 1948, she was sold to Bosey, Philippines, though never delivered. On 2 October 1948, Bosey resold her to T. Y. Fong.

References 

Ships built in Michigan
1942 ships
World War II auxiliary ships of the United Kingdom
World War II auxiliary ships of the United States
Tugs of the United States Navy
Ships transferred from the United States Navy to the Royal Navy
Favourite-class tugboats